The Companies Act 1947 was a United Kingdom Act of Parliament, that updated UK company law after the Companies Act 1929.

It covered issues such as winding up and bankruptcy.

It was soon recodified in the Companies Act 1948.

See also
UK company law

United Kingdom company law
United Kingdom Acts of Parliament 1947